Wyoming Highway 14 (WYO 14) is a  unsigned Wyoming state highway connecting Wyoming Highway 130 with Laramie Regional Airport, just west of Laramie.

Route description 
Highway 14 is one of the shortest state-maintained routes in the state, at just  in length. It connects WYO 130 (Snowy Range Road) with Laramie Regional Airport.

History
Wyoming Highway 14 was the old designation for the current ALT US 14 between Cody and Burgess Junction located in Park and Big Horn Counties in northwestern Wyoming. That routing existed between 1940 and approximately 1965. Confusion between WYO 14 and US 14 caused the Wyoming Highway Department to recommission Wyoming Highway 14 as Alternate US 14.

Major intersections

References

External links

 Wyoming Routes 0-99
 WYO 14 - WYO 130 to Laramie Regional Airport

Transportation in Albany County, Wyoming
014
U.S. Route 14
State highways in the United States shorter than one mile